Laura Evans (born 1986) is a Welsh snooker player. She has been Welsh Ladies' snooker champion three times, and was runner-up in the 2015 Eden Ladies Masters and the 2017 World Women's 10-Red Championship.

Biography
Evans started playing snooker aged 14. She started entering women's tournaments in Wales, and won her first event at 15. The following year, with a practice routine of playing around six hours a day, she started entering world ladies snooker events. Evans won Welsh Ladies Championship in three consecutive years. She stopped playing on the women's snooker circuit in 2003, following the effect of the tobacco sponsorship ban on the game. In 2014 she started playing again, at Star Snooker Club in Skewen. In 2015 entered the Eden Masters, and defeated reigning world champion Ng On-yee on the way to reaching her first ranking event final.

Evans and her playing partner Suzie Opacic were runners-up in the Women's Pairs Championship in both 2017 and 2018.

In 2019. Evans and Wendy Jans of Belgium were the "Rest of the World" team at the 2019 Women's Snooker World Cup. They won all three of their group stage matches but then lost in the quarter final to the "England A" team of Reanne Evans and Rebecca Kenna.

Evans' main career is as a support worker for women with mental health problems.

Titles and achievements

References

1986 births
Welsh snooker players
Female snooker players
Living people